Robert Hayden Mounce (December 30, 1921 – January 24, 2019) was an American New Testament scholar, and president emeritus of Whitworth University in Spokane, Washington.

Mounce was born in LaSalle, Illinois, in December 1921 and raised in Minot, North Dakota. During the Second World War, he served as a dive bomber pilot in the Naval Air Corps (1943–1946). After the war, he taught
public school and served as a missionary in Guatemala, where he was director of the Christian radio station TGNA. He married Jean McTavish in 1952.

Mounce graduated with a BA in music in 1953 from the University of Washington, and he also studied at Multnomah School of the Bible.  He earned a ThM in New Testament from Fuller Theological Seminary, and a PhD from the University of Aberdeen. Mounce taught at Bethel College and Seminary and was Dean of the Arts and Humanities Department at Western Kentucky University before becoming president of Whitworth College.  After retiring from Whitworth, Dr. Mounce served as the senior pastor of Christ Community Church, Walnut Creek, California, until 1991.

Mounce wrote commentaries on Revelation, Romans, and Matthew. He was a member of the translation teams for the New International Version, the New Living Translation, and the English Standard Version.

He died in January 2019 at the age of 97. 

His older son, William D. Mounce, is also a New Testament scholar. His younger son, David McTavish Mounce, is an aerospace designer and inventor.

References

1921 births
2019 deaths
Alumni of the University of Aberdeen
American biblical scholars
Bethel University (Minnesota) faculty
Bible commentators
Fuller Theological Seminary alumni
Military personnel from Illinois
Multnomah University alumni
New Testament scholars
People from Minot, North Dakota
People from LaSalle, Illinois
Seminary presidents
Translators of the Bible into English
University of Washington School of Music alumni
Western Kentucky University faculty
Whitworth University faculty
Writers from Illinois
Writers from North Dakota
20th-century translators